Elaeocarpus royenii is a species of flowering plant in the Elaeocarpaceae family. It is found only in West Papua (Indonesia).

References

royenii
Flora of Western New Guinea
Vulnerable plants
Taxonomy articles created by Polbot